Joy Ride is a 1935 British comedy film directed by Harry Hughes and starring Gene Gerrard, Zelma O'Neal and Betty Ann Davies. The film was made at the Nettlefold Studios in Walton. The film's art direction was by Don Russell.

Cast

References

Bibliography
 Low, Rachael. Filmmaking in 1930s Britain. George Allen & Unwin, 1985.
 Wood, Linda. British Films, 1927-1939. British Film Institute, 1986.

External links

1935 films
1935 comedy films
British comedy films
Films shot at Nettlefold Studios
Films set in England
Films set in London
Films directed by Harry Hughes
British black-and-white films
Films scored by Eric Spear
1930s English-language films
1930s British films
English-language comedy films